Vasily Stepanov may refer to:
 Vasily Stepanov (actor), Russian film actor
 Vasily Stepanov (critic), Russian cinema critic and journalist